Charlie Martin Seaman (born 30 September 1999) is an English professional footballer who plays as a right back for Doncaster Rovers.

Playing career
Seaman began his career as a youth player at West Ham United. He was released in 2016 and joined AFC Bournemouth, playing initially in their under-18 team. He joined Weymouth in the Southern League on a youth loan in November 2017, scoring on his debut against Kings Langley.

He signed his first professional contract with Bournemouth in 2018. In January 2019, he was loaned to Scottish Championship club Dundee United until the end of the 2018–19 season. He made his debut in a 1–0 defeat against Ayr United.

Seaman was on trial with EFL League Two club Exeter City in July 2019, playing in a pre-season friendly against Taunton Town. In September 2019, Bournemouth loaned him to Eastleigh in the National League until the following January. After making 24 appearances for Eastleigh, he returned to Bournemouth having been ruled out for the next three months with a hamstring injury. Seaman went on loan again at the end of the January 2020 transfer window, joining Maidstone United in National League South until the end of the 2019–20 season. They were willing to sign him while he was still recovering from injury, as it was at no cost to the club. He made his Maidstone debut as a substitute against Eastbourne Borough on 14 March, just prior to football being suspended due to the coronavirus pandemic.

Seaman was released by Bournemouth at the end of his contract in June 2020. On 1 October 2020, he joined League One club Doncaster Rovers on a one-year contract and was subsequently loaned out to Maidstone United. He returned to Doncaster for the remainder of the 2020-21 season as the regional National League season at Maidstone was cancelled.

References

External links

Non-league stats

1999 births
Living people
English footballers
Association football fullbacks
West Ham United F.C. players
AFC Bournemouth players
Weymouth F.C. players
Dundee United F.C. players
Eastleigh F.C. players
Maidstone United F.C. players
Doncaster Rovers F.C. players
Southern Football League players
Scottish Professional Football League players
National League (English football) players
English Football League players